Marcopolo S.A. is a Brazilian bus, coach and rail manufacturer, founded on 6 August 1949 in the southern Brazilian city of Caxias do Sul, state of Rio Grande do Sul. The company manufactures the bodies for a whole range of coaches, e.g. microbus, intercity, and touring models.

It is the largest bus car manufacturer in Latin America and the third worldwide, over half of the bus bodies in Brazil are from the company, and its coaches were exported to 100 countries. They have six plants in Brazil, Chile, France, Italy, Portugal and South Africa. Some technology was transferred to India's Tata Motors in form of Tata Marcopolo Motors Ltd.

History
Marcopolo was founded on 6 August 1949 in Caxias do Sul as Nicola & Cia Ltd., production was entirely handmade, a company then having 8 partners and 15 employees. In 1953, Marcopolo starts the production of the first steel structures. In 1971, the company changed name to Marcopolo S.A. Carrocerias e Ônibus (Marcopolo S.A. Body and Bus manufacturer). In 2013, made a joint-venture Urban Buses, a  million strategic investment, with New Flyer.

Brand names
 Ciferal - was focused on urban operations, defunct brand
 Marcopolo, Paradiso G8
 Marcopolo Rail
 Volare - dedicated to the development, production and commercialization of the Access, Attack & Fly models of the Ambulance, Fire Department, Easy Access, Mobile Unit sectors, Municipal, Police School bus and Tourism
 Neobus - Thunder & Thunder Midi (Countryside School Buses)
 SUPERPOLO S.A.

Subsidiaries
MVC - which started its activities operating in the automotive industry and gradually broadened its operations, introducing its plastic products to the light industry and infra-structure markets, etc.
Moneo - the financial service unit of Marcopolo.
Volgren - is an Australian bodywork company owned by Marcopolo.

Products Marcopolo
Allegro
Andare Class
Attivi, (joint venture with BYD)
Boxer (joint venture with Volvo)
Ideale
Listo (only available in Colombia from SUPERPOLO S.A).
Multego 
Paradiso G7 & G8 series, DD, 1800, 1600, 1350, 1200, 1050, 900
GV 1000 (1988-2000)
G6 1050 (1998-2011)
Senior
Temple (only available in Colombia from SUPERPOLO S.A).
Torino
Torino G4 (1982-1988)
Torino GV (1993-1998)
Torino G6 (1998-2007)
Torino G7 (2007-2016)
Viaggio 800
Viale

Rail
People Movers
Prosper VLT
Rail

Gallery

References

External links
Marcopolo S.A. website (English)
Marcopolo website (English)
Buses Volare en Chile Representante Comercial Marcopolo S.A. website (Español)

Bus manufacturers of Brazil
Companies based in Rio Grande do Sul
Vehicle manufacturing companies established in 1949
Multinational companies headquartered in Brazil
Companies listed on B3 (stock exchange)
Brazilian brands
1949 establishments in Brazil